Best in the World 2013 was a professional wrestling internet pay-per-view (iPPV) event produced by Ring of Honor (ROH). It took place on June 22, 2013, at the Du Burns Arena in Baltimore, Maryland. It was the fourth ROH Best in the World event.

Storylines
Best in the World 2013 featured professional wrestling matches, which involved different wrestlers from pre-existing scripted feuds, plots, and storylines that played out on ROH's television programs. Wrestlers portrayed villains or heroes as they followed a series of events that built tension and culminated in a wrestling match or series of matches.

Aftermath
Best in the World 2013 would be Ring of Honor's final live internet pay-per-view. Following the live broadcast of the event, which like many ROH iPPVs was marred by technical difficulties, Ring of Honor announced it would cease streaming live shows. Instead, all future major shows would be recorded live and then made available via the internet the following day as a Video-On-Demand (VOD).

Results

References

Ring of Honor pay-per-view events
2013 in Maryland
Events in Baltimore
2013
Professional wrestling in Baltimore
June 2013 events in the United States
2013 Ring of Honor pay-per-view events